The 2017 Summit League men's basketball tournament was the post-season men's basketball tournament for the Summit League. The tournament was held from March 4–7, 2017 at the Denny Sanford Premier Center in Sioux Falls, South Dakota. The winners of the tournament, South Dakota State, received an automatic bid to the 2017 NCAA tournament with a 79–77 win over Omaha in the finals. This was South Dakota State's fourth championship in six years.

Seeds
The top 8 teams in the final standings qualified for the tournament. 

Teams were seeded by record within the conference, with a tiebreaker system to seed teams with identical conference records.

Schedule

Bracket

* denotes overtime period

References

Summit League men's basketball tournament
2016–17 Summit League men's basketball season
The Summit League men's basketball tournament
Basketball competitions in Sioux Falls, South Dakota
College basketball tournaments in South Dakota